Dushk is a former municipality in the Fier County, western Albania. At the 2015 local government reform it became a subdivision of the municipality Lushnjë. The population at the 2011 census was 7,872.

Economy
The economy of Dushk is based on agriculture. There are many farms such as olive oil farms and small food processing factories. Most of the population of the subdivision have farms. There are many businesses such as cafes, bars, and shops that support the economy. There are many gas stations due to the SH4 state road passing on the side of it.

References

Former municipalities in Fier County
Administrative units of Lushnjë